Volgoprombank is a Russian private bank, based in Volgograd in the Volga region.
In November 2007, the bank principal shareholder (95%), Russian MP and businessman Oleg Mikheyev, sold its stake to Promsvyazbank's main shareholders, brothers Dmitry and Alexey Ananyev 
In May 2009, Mikheyev has sued prominent business daily Kommersant for $217 million claiming that one of the newspaper's article had spoiled the bank reputation at the time he sold the bank and forced him to sell his shares at a disadvantageous price.

References 

Defunct banks of Russia
Companies based in Volgograd Oblast